The 2011 Gael Linn Cup, the most important representative competition for elite level participants in the women's team field sport of camogie, was played at junior level according to the on a bi-ennial programme devised by congress 2010. It was won by Munster, who defeated Leinster in the final, played at St Jude's in Dubin.

Final stages

References

External links
 Camogie Association

2011 in camogie
2011
Cam